Nicolae Herlea (28 August 1927 – 24 February 2014) was a highly acclaimed Romanian operatic baritone, particularly associated with the Italian repertory, especially the role of Rossini's Figaro, which he sang around 550 times during his career and the title role of Rigoletto

Biography 

Born in Bucharest, Romania, Herlea studied at the Bucharest Music Conservatory under Aurelius Costescu-Duca, and later at the Accademia di Santa Cecilia in Rome under Giorgio Favaretto. In 1951, he won first prizes in international singing contests in Geneva, Prague, and Brussels. He made his stage debut that same year at the National Opera of Bucharest as Silvio in Pagliacci, quickly establishing himself as the principal baritone there.

In 1958, he began appearing abroad, particularly at the Bolshoi Theatre in Moscow, to where he regularly returned. He also made guest appearances at London's Royal Opera House (1961), La Scala in Milan (1963) and the Metropolitan Opera in New York (1964–67), and also performed at the Liceo in Barcelona, the Berlin Staatsoper, the Vienna State Opera, the Salzburg Festival, La Monnaie in Brussels, and in the opera houses of Prague and Budapest.

He made complete studio recordings of Il barbiere di Siviglia, Lucia di Lammermoor, Rigoletto, La traviata, La forza del destino, Cavalleria rusticana, Pagliacci andTosca, on labels such as Supraphon and Electrecord.

Herlea also had a successful career in the concert-hall. After he retired, he taught master classes at the Bucharest Conservatory.

He was the President of the Jury of the Hariclea Darclée International Voice Competition.

Family 
He married Simona, a gynecologist, in 1969, and they had two sons, Robert Nicolae and Filip Anton. In 1983, Simona defected to Germany. During the last years of his life, Herlea lived in Frankfurt, Germany, with his wife and sons.

References 

 grandi-tenori.com

External links
 Nicolae Herlea Web Site
 

1927 births
Accademia Nazionale di Santa Cecilia alumni
2014 deaths
Musicians from Bucharest
Romanian operatic baritones
20th-century Romanian male opera singers
National University of Music Bucharest alumni